The All-Russian Institute of Light Alloys, formerly the Vils Scientific Production Association is a company based in Moscow, Russia. Rostec is the largest shareholder, controlling 39% of the institute.

The VILS Scientific Production Association consists of the All-Russian Institute of Light Alloys, the Light Alloy Works, and the Zubtsov Engineering Plant. It is one of several metallurgical organizations which developed and manufactured semi-finished products from steel, aluminum, magnesium, titanium, nickel and super alloys for the Soviet Ministry of the Aviation Industry. VILS markets extrusions, forgings and semi-finished metallurgical products as well as laminated and composite materials, special coatings for tools, and designs for metallurgical equipment.

References

External links
 Official website

Manufacturing companies of Russia
Companies based in Moscow
Rostec
Ministry of the Aviation Industry (Soviet Union)
Aerospace companies of the Soviet Union
Metal companies of the Soviet Union
Research institutes in the Soviet Union